Peter Nash Lupus Jr. (born June 17, 1932) is an American bodybuilder and actor. He is best known for his role as Willy Armitage on the television series Mission: Impossible (1966–1973).

Personal life 
Lupus was one of three siblings born in Indianapolis, Indiana to Mary Irene ( Lambert; 1910-2003) and Peter Nash Lupus (1898-1981). His father was from what is now Saraain El Tahta, Lebanon. 

Lupus attended the Jordan College of Fine Arts at Butler University, where he also played football and basketball, graduating in 1954. He and his wife, Sharon, have a son, Peter Nash Lupus III, who is also an actor.

Career

Bodybuilder
Standing  with a developed physique, Lupus began his career by earning the titles of Mr. Indianapolis, Mr. Indiana, Mr. Hercules and Mr. International Health Physique. Lupus was one of many bodybuilders who followed Steve Reeves into the "sword and sandal" films of the 1960s, occasionally credited as Rock Stevens for such films as Hercules and the Tyrants of Babylon (1964), Challenge of the Gladiator (1965) and Muscle Beach Party (1964) where he starred as "Mr. Galaxy" Flex Martian.

During the early 1970s, Lupus promoted European Health Spa, traveling the country to make appearances and sign autographs at several of the gyms' grand openings.

Actor
Lupus played Willy Armitage in the original Mission: Impossible television series in the 1960s. Armitage was the Impossible Missions Force's muscle man, and featured in nearly all episodes of the series. The character of Willy Armitage was the strong, silent type, usually with very little dialogue. Late in the show's run, during season five, the producers decided that his character was superfluous and he was dropped to recurring status, appearing in a little over half of that season's episodes. Outcry from fans and lack of success in finding a replacement for his character — originally replaced by Sam Elliott — resulted in his return to regular status the following season and to his getting a greater role in the stories, often assuming disguises as a convict or a thug. Only Bob Johnson and Greg Morris sustained regular roles through the show's entire run.

Lupus' other television work included a guest spot as Tarzan on Jack Benny's television show, a boxer with a glass jaw on The Joey Bishop Show, a caveman on an episode of Fantasy Island, and the recurring role of Detective Norberg on the short-lived sitcom Police Squad!

Playgirl pinup
Lupus was one of the first well-known male actors to pose with full frontal nudity for Playgirl magazine, in April 1974. Photographs of Lupus appeared in a number of issues. Before this, he was hired by the United States Air Force to appear in a series of commercials playing the role of Superman (with the permission of what is now DC Comics). He appeared for many months until the Playgirl pictorial was published.

Present day
On July 19, 2007, at age 75, Lupus set a world weightlifting endurance record by lifting  over the course of 24 minutes, 50 seconds at the Spectrum Club in El Segundo, California.

Lupus was a member of Sheriff Joe Arpaio's volunteer posse in Maricopa County, Arizona.

References

Further reading
 Patrick J. White, The Complete Mission: Impossible Dossier. New York: Avon Books, 1991.

External links

 
 
 

1932 births
20th-century American male actors
American bodybuilders
American male film actors
American male stage actors
American male television actors
Butler Bulldogs football players
Sportspeople from Indianapolis
People associated with physical culture
Playgirl Men of the Month
American people of Lebanese descent
American people of Greek descent
Male actors from Indianapolis
Living people